Aethiothemis basilewskyi is a species of dragonfly in the family Libellulidae. It is native to Africa, where it occurs in the Democratic Republic of the Congo and Zambia.

Sources 

Libellulidae
Insects of Zambia
Insects of the Democratic Republic of the Congo
Insects described in 1954
Taxa named by Frederic Charles Fraser
Taxonomy articles created by Polbot